Acidovorax citrulli (formerly A. avenae subsp. citrulli (Williems et al., 1992)) is a Gram-negative, biotrophic bacterium causes seedling blight and bacterial fruit blotch (BFB) of cucurbits. On the basis of carbon source utilization, DNA-fingerprinting profiles, whole-cell fatty-acid composition utilization and pathogenicity assays, A. citrulli is divided into two distinct groups (Walcott et al., 2004; Burdman et al., 2005; Bahar & Burdman, 2010). The group I strains are mainly associated with non-watermelon plants (mainly melon), while group II includes strains that were mainly isolated from watermelon.

BFB is a sporadic disease but under favorable environment, it becomes devastating and may cause 100% loss of marketable fruit. The destructive potential of this disease was realized after massive outbreaks in commercial lots at various eastern states of the United States during the late 80s. After the outbreak, this disease got much attention from the scientific community. Most efforts have been put on applied research, including improvement of diagnostics methods for A. citrulli detection in contaminated seeds, and screens for BFB resistance.

References

External links
 Type strain of Acidovorax citrulli at BacDive -  the Bacterial Diversity Metadatabase

Comamonadaceae
Bacteria described in 1992
Bacterial plant pathogens and diseases
Food plant pathogens and diseases